Gail Hellenbrand (August 27, 1921 – December 29, 1996) was an American politician from New York.

Early life and education
She was born Gail Abbey Ginsberg on August 27, 1921, in Brooklyn. She attended Manual Training High School and Spencer-Eastman Finishing School. On July 29, 1945, she married Julius A. Hellenbrand (1913-2015), later a Justice of the New York Supreme Court, and their only child was the scholar and academic administrator Harold Hellenbrand (born 1953).

Career

Gail Hellenbrand was a member of the New York State Assembly from 1966 to 1970, sitting in the 176th, 177th and 178th New York State Legislatures.

She was a member of the New York State Temporary Commission on Regulation of Lobbying.

Death

She died on December 29, 1996, in San Diego, California.

References

1921 births
1996 deaths
Politicians from Brooklyn
Democratic Party members of the New York State Assembly
Women state legislators in New York (state)
20th-century American politicians
20th-century American women politicians